Chiang Tsu-ping (born 30 January 1978) is a Taiwanese actress and television host, best known for her television dramas. Between 2005 and 2010 Chiang emerged as a viewers' favorite in Taiwan and other Hokkien-speaking regions for her diverse roles in long-running soap operas like The Unforgettable Memory, The Spirit of Love, Mom's House and Night Market Life. Singapore's The New Paper called her the "Hokkien soap queen".

Since 2011 she has largely forgone Hokkien-language dramas, instead focusing her career on Mandarin-language dramas in mainland China, where she also built a sizable and growing fan base.

Selected filmography
Tomorrow
Wind and Cloud
100% Senorita
The Pawnshop No. 8
The Unforgettable Memory
The Spirit of Love
Mom's House
Night Market Life
Imperfect
Taste of Life

References

External links

 
 
 
 

20th-century Taiwanese actresses
21st-century Taiwanese actresses
Taiwanese television actresses
Taiwanese film actresses
1978 births
Living people
Taiwanese television presenters
Taiwanese women television presenters